Immunoglobulin kappa locus, also known as IGK@, is a region on the p arm of human chromosome 2, region 11.2 (2p11.2), that contains genes for the kappa (κ) light chains of antibodies (or immunoglobulins).

In humans the κ chain is coded for by V (variable), J (joining) and C (constant) genes in this region. These genes undergo V(D)J recombination to generate a diverse repertoire of  immunoglobulins.

Genes 
The immunoglobulin kappa locus contains the following genes:
 IGKC: immunoglobulin kappa constant
 IGKJ@: immunoglobulin kappa joining group
 IGKJ1, IGKJ2, IGKJ3, IGKJ4, IGKJ5
 IGKV@: immunoglobulin kappa variable group
 IGKV1-5, IGKV1-6, IGKV1-8, IGKV1-9, IGKV1-12, IGKV1-16, IGKV1-17, IGKV1-27, IGKV1-33
 IGKV1D-8, IGKV1D-12, IGKV1D-13, IGKV1D-16, IGKV1D-17, IGKV1D-22, IGKV1D-27, IGKV1D-32, IGKV1D-33, IGKV1D-39, IGKV1D-43
 IGKV2-24, IGKV2-28, IGKV2-30, IGKV2-40
 IGKV2D-26, IGKV2D-28, IGKV2D-29, IGKV2D-30, IGKV2D-40
 IGKV3-11, IGKV3-15, IGKV3-20
 IGKV3D-7, IGKV3D-11, IGKV3D-20
 IGKV4-1
 IGKV5-2
 and a number of non-functional and pseudogenes

References

Further reading

Antibodies
Proteins